The Free Republican Party or Al-Hizb al-Gomhory al-Ahrar is a political party in Egypt. The Free Republican Party might be considered as a liberal party.

History and profile
The party was established in 2006. The leader of the party, which regards the Islamic Shariah as the core of legislation and supports a free economic system, is Hossam Mostafa.

Platform
 Upholding Islamic Sharia as the main source of legislation. 
 Supporting Egypt's right to sovereignty over its territories and national waters and upholds the country's historical right to the leadership of both the Arab and Islamic regions. 
 Underlining the need to maintaining Egypt's social fabric and promotes equality between Egyptians. 
 Upholding political freedoms and human rights and endorses respect of the Constitution and the rule of the law. 
 Advocating multi-partisanship. 
 Supporting free education, social solidarity and social justice. 
 Supporting state-provided mother, child and youth care. 
 Advocating the elimination of economic monopolies. 
 Advocating separation of the legislative, judicial and executive authorities. 
 Advocating integration with the Arab world and the reviving of Arab nationalism.

See also
Liberalism
Contributions to liberal theory
Liberalism worldwide
List of liberal parties
Liberal democracy
Liberalism in Egypt

References

2006 establishments in Egypt
Arab nationalism in Egypt
Arab nationalist political parties
Islamic political parties in Egypt
Liberal parties in Egypt
Nationalist parties in Egypt
Political parties established in 2006